The 2018–19 Pro A season, for sponsorships reasons the Jeep Élite, was the 97th season of the Pro A, the top basketball league in France organised by the Ligue Nationale de Basket (LNB). It was the second season with Jeep as main sponsor. The season started on 21 September 2018 with the regular season and ended on 25 June 2019 with the last game of the finals.

LDLC ASVEL won its nineteenth French championship and its first one since 2016. In the finals, they defeated Monaco.

Teams

Promotion and relegation
Hyères-Toulon and Boulazac Basket Dordogne were relegated after the 2017–18 season after the teams ended in the last two places.

Blois promoted by finishing first in the regular season with a 27–7 record in the Pro B. Fos Provence made its Pro A debut after promoting, as Fos defeated Roanne in the finals of the promotion play-offs.

However, as ADA Blois did not meet the requirements for playing in Pro A, Boulazac remained in the league.

Locations and arenas

Personnel and sponsorship

Managerial changes

Budgets 
On 3 October 2018, the LNB published the budgets and salary expenditures of the Pro A clubs.

Regular season

League table

Results

Play-offs
Quarterfinals were played in a best-of-three games format, while the semifinals and the finals in a best-of-five (2–2–1) format.

Bracket

Quarterfinals

|}

Semifinals

|}

Finals

|}

French clubs in European competitions

Individual honours

Season awards

References

External links
Official website

LNB Pro A seasons
French
LNB Pro A